Finnish Aviation Academy Ltd (FINAA for short) is an aviation school based in Pori, Finland. It is located near the Pori Airport. The academy is a private school owned by the state of Finland, the national airline Finnair and the city of Pori.

History 
Finnish Aviation Academy was established 1964 in Helsinki by Finnair. It was transferred to Kuopio in 1976 and later in 1985 to Pori as the Satakunta Air Command was moved to Tampere–Pirkkala Airport. Academy was originally known as Finnair Aviation Academy and renamed in 2002. During 2009-2011 academy trained also helicopter pilots to fill the need for new pilots in Finland.

Fleet 
Cessna 172
Cessna 152
Diamond DA42
EMB-500
Extra 300L

Notable alumni 
Hannu Manninen

References

External links 

Finnish Aviation Academy Official Homepage

Aviation schools
Aviation in Finland
Schools in Finland
Buildings and structures in Pori